is a Japanese actress and singer. She graduated from Ono Gakuen Girls High School. She is currently married (her husband is a doctor). She is represented with Office Mitsui.

Main singles

Main albums

Filmography

Films

TV dramas

Stage

Other TV programmes

Radio

Advertisements

References

External links
Yoshimi Ashikawa's profile, photos, images - goo News 

1958 births
Living people
Japanese actresses
People from Tokyo